7638 Gladman, provisional designation , is a stony background asteroid from the central region of the asteroid belt, approximately  in diameter. It was discovered on 26 October 1984, by American astronomer Edward Bowell at Lowell's Anderson Mesa Station near Flagstaff, Arizona. The S-type asteroid has a rotation period of 17.3 hours. It was named after Canadian astronomer Brett J. Gladman.

Orbit and classification 

Gladman is a non-family asteroid from the main belt's background population. It orbits the Sun in the central asteroid belt at a distance of 1.7–3.3 AU once every 4 years and 1 month (1,478 days; semi-major axis of 2.54 AU). Its orbit has an eccentricity of 0.31 and an inclination of 7° with respect to the ecliptic. Gladman is not far from a prominent Kirkwood gap at 2.5 AU, which corresponds to a 3:1 orbital resonance with the gas giant Jupiter, where the Alinda asteroid are located. However, Gladman eccentricity is lower than that of most Alinda asteroids.

The asteroid's observation arc begins with its first used observation at Palomar in November 1984, one month after its official discovery at Anderson Mesa.

Naming 

This minor planet was named for Canadian astronomer Brett J. Gladman (born 1966), discoverer of minor planets and co-discoverer of 6 irregular moons of Uranus: Caliban, Sycorax, Prospero, Setebos, Stephano and Ferdinand. He participated in surveys of trans-Neptunian objects. He is also known for his research and modeling on the dynamical evolution and transport of near-Earth objects and meteorites, respectively. The approved  was published by the Minor Planet Center on 28 July 1999.

Physical characteristics 

Gladman has been characterized as a stony S-type asteroid in the Tholen-like taxonomy of the Small Solar System Objects Spectroscopic Survey (S3OS2). In their SMASS-like taxonomy, S3OS2 classified Gladman as an Sk-subtype that transitions to the K-type asteroids.

Rotation period 

Three rotational lightcurves of Gladman have been obtained from photometric observations. In October 2014, observations by French amateur astronomer Laurent Bernasconi gave a fragmentary lightcurve with a rotation period of 15 hours and brightness variation of 0.21 magnitude.

Diameter and albedo 

According to the survey carried out by NASA's Wide-field Infrared Survey Explorer with its subsequent NEOWISE mission, the asteroid measures 5.839 kilometers in diameter and its surface has an albedo of 0.248, while the Collaborative Asteroid Lightcurve Link assumes a standard albedo for stony asteroids of 0.20 and calculates a diameter of 5.9 kilometers with an absolute magnitude of 13.5.

References

External links 
 Asteroid Lightcurve Database (LCDB), query form (info )
 Dictionary of Minor Planet Names, Google books
 Asteroids and comets rotation curves, CdR – Observatoire de Genève, Raoul Behrend
 Discovery Circumstances: Numbered Minor Planets (5001)-(10000) – Minor Planet Center
 
 

007638
Discoveries by Edward L. G. Bowell
Named minor planets
19841026